Katarina Jokić (born 19 April 1998) is a Serbian female tennis player.

Jokić has a career high WTA singles ranking of 417 achieved on 17 October 2022. She also has a career high WTA doubles ranking of 517 achieved on 03 October 2022.

Jokić played college tennis at Georgia Bulldogs.

Playing for Serbia Fed Cup team, Jokić has a win–loss record of 0–1 in Fed Cup competition.

ITF Finals

Singles: 3 (2 titles, 1 runner–up)

Doubles: 3 (2 titles, 1 runner–up)

References

External links
 
 

1998 births
Living people
Serbian female tennis players
Bosnia and Herzegovina female tennis players
People from Zrenjanin
Georgia Lady Bulldogs tennis players
Serbs of Bosnia and Herzegovina
Serbian expatriate sportspeople in Bosnia and Herzegovina
Bosnia and Herzegovina people of Serbian descent